Frank Charles Shorter (born October 31, 1947) is an American former long-distance runner who won the gold medal in the marathon at the 1972 Summer Olympics and the silver medal at the 1976 Summer Olympics.  His Olympic success, along with the achievements of other American runners, is credited with igniting the running boom in the United States during the 1970s.

Early life and education 
Frank Shorter was born in Munich, Germany, where his father, physician Samuel S. Shorter, served in the U.S. Army.  He grew up in Middletown, New York, where a street was named in his honor (Frank Shorter Way). Frank Shorter Way was formerly part of the Orange Classic 10K course route, which Shorter won in its inaugural race in 1981.  After earning his high school diploma from the Mount Hermon School in Gill, Massachusetts, in 1965, Shorter graduated from Yale University in New Haven, Connecticut, with a Bachelor of Arts degree (B.A.) in 1969, and the University of Florida College of Law in Gainesville, Florida, with a Juris Doctor degree (J.D.) in 1974.

In the October 2011 issue of Runner's World, an article by John Brant detailed the traumatic household life Frank and his siblings suffered at the hands of his extremely abusive father and the buckle end of his belt. With the publication of the Runner's World article, Shorter began to elaborate on stopping similar cycles of violence in more detail and in public.

Running career 
Shorter first achieved distinction by winning the 1969 National Collegiate Athletic Association (NCAA) six mile run title during his senior year at Yale.  He won his first U.S. national titles in 1970 in the three mile and six mile events.  He also was the U.S. national six mile/10,000 meter champion in 1971, 1974, 1975 and 1977.

After graduating from Yale, Shorter chose to pursue a Doctor of Medicine degree at the University of New Mexico. However, he dropped out after six weeks after classes began to impact his training regime. Soon, he moved to Florida to study for a Juris Doctor degree at the University of Florida in Gainesville because of the excellence of the environment and the opportunity to train with Jack Bacheler as members of the Florida Track Club (FTC), founded by Jimmy Carnes, then the head coach of the Florida Gators track and field team. Bacheler was regarded as America's best distance runner, having qualified for the finals of the 5,000-meter race at the 1968 Mexico City Olympics.  The FTC's core nucleus of Shorter, Bacheler and Jeff Galloway qualified for the 1972 Olympics and their success made Gainesville the Mecca of distance running on the East Coast in the early 1970s.

Shorter won the U.S. national cross-country championships four times (1970–1973).  He was the U.S. Olympic Trials champion in both the 10,000-meter run and the marathon in both 1972 and 1976.  He also won both the 10,000-meter run and the marathon at the 1971 Pan American Games. Shorter was a four-time winner of the Fukuoka Marathon (1971–1974), generally recognized as the most prestigious marathon in the world at that time and held on a very fast course. His career best of 2:10:30 was set at that race on December 3, 1972. Several months later, on March 18, 1973, Shorter won the elite Lake Biwa Marathon in 2:12:03. He won the prestigious 7-mile Falmouth Road Race on Cape Cod in 1975 and 1976 and Atlanta's 10-kilometer Peachtree Road Race in 1977.

Shorter achieved his greatest recognition in the marathon, and he is the only American athlete to win two medals in the Olympic marathon. At the Munich Games—which coincidentally is Shorter's place of birth— he finished fifth in the 10,000-meter final, breaking the American record for the event that he had established in his qualifying heat. A few days later, he won the gold medal in the marathon. This ultimate achievement was marred by an impostor, West German student Norbert Sudhaus, who ran into Olympic Stadium ahead of Shorter. Shorter was not bothered by the silence from the crowd who had been duped into thinking that he was running for the silver medal. Shorter was confident that he was going to win the gold medal because he knew that no competing runner had passed him. He received the James E. Sullivan Award afterwards as the top amateur athlete in the United States.  At the 1976 Summer Olympics in Montreal, Shorter dropped out of the 10,000 meters in order to concentrate exclusively on the marathon, winning the silver medal in the marathon and finishing behind previously unheralded Waldemar Cierpinski of East Germany. Cierpinski was later implicated as a part of the state-sponsored doping program by East German track and field research files uncovered by Werner Franke at the Stasi headquarters in Leipzig in the late 1990s. There were suspicions about other East German athletes during the Montreal Olympics, including the East German women's swimming team led by Kornelia Ender; the East German women won eleven of the thirteen events.

From 2000 to 2003, Shorter was the chairman of the United States Anti-Doping Agency, a body that he helped to establish.

Shorter was featured as a prominent character, played by Jeremy Sisto, in the 1998 film Without Limits.  The film follows the life of Shorter's contemporary, training partner, Olympic teammate and sometime rival, Steve Prefontaine.  Shorter was the next to last person to see Prefontaine alive before he died in an automobile accident.

Shorter was inducted into the United States Olympic Hall of Fame in 1984, the USA National Track and Field Hall of Fame in 1989, and the National Distance Running Hall of Fame in 1998.

A long-time resident of Boulder, Colorado, Shorter co-founded the Bolder Boulder in 1979. The annual 10k race is a popular Memorial Day event, which culminates with a tribute to U.S. Armed Forces at Folsom Field at the University of Colorado. A life-size bronze statue of Shorter stands outside the stadium.

Track & field news rankings

World rankings 
Marathon
 1971 – 1st
 1972 – 1st
 1973 – 1st
 1974 – 2nd
 1976 – 2nd

10,000 m
 1970 – 2nd
 1972 – 5th
 1974 – 5th
 1975 – 2nd

5000 m
 1975 – 10th

U.S. rankings
Marathon
 1971 – 1st
 1972 – 1st
 1973 – 1st
 1974 – 1st
 1976 – 1st

10,000 m
 1969 – 3rd
 1970 – 1st
 1971 – 1st
 1972 – 1st
 1973 – 5th
 1974 – 1st
 1975 – 1st
 1976 – 2nd
 1977 – 1st
 1979 – 3rd
5000 m
 1969 – 6th
 1970 – 2nd
 1971 – 4th
 1972 – 10th
 1973 – 7th
 1974 – 4th
 1975 – 3rd
 1976 – 5th
 1977 – 7th

Personal records 
 2 miles - 8:26.2 (1971)
 3 miles – 12:52.0 (1974)
 5000 meters – 13:26.60 (1977)
 10,000 meters – 27:45.91 (1975)
 Marathon (42.195 km) – 2:10:30 (1972)

See also 

List of Levin College of Law graduates
List of University of Florida alumni
List of University of Florida Olympians
List of Yale University people

References

External links

 
 

1947 births
Living people
Sportspeople from Munich
People from Middletown, Orange County, New York
Track and field athletes from New York (state)
American male long-distance runners
American male marathon runners
American sports announcers
American masters athletes
Olympic male marathon runners
Olympic gold medalists for the United States in track and field
Olympic silver medalists for the United States in track and field
Athletes (track and field) at the 1972 Summer Olympics
Athletes (track and field) at the 1976 Summer Olympics
Medalists at the 1972 Summer Olympics
Medalists at the 1976 Summer Olympics
Pan American Games track and field athletes for the United States
Pan American Games gold medalists for the United States
Pan American Games medalists in athletics (track and field)
Athletes (track and field) at the 1971 Pan American Games
Athletes (track and field) at the 1979 Pan American Games
USA Outdoor Track and Field Championships winners
USA Indoor Track and Field Championships winners
Japan Championships in Athletics winners
James E. Sullivan Award recipients
Fredric G. Levin College of Law alumni
Yale University alumni
Northfield Mount Hermon School alumni
Medalists at the 1971 Pan American Games
Medalists at the 1979 Pan American Games